Deidré Maudelene Baartman (born 7 February 1991) is a South African politician of the Democratic Alliance (DA). She is currently a Member of the Western Cape Provincial Parliament. She is the Chairperson of both the Standing Committee on Finance, Economic Opportunities and Tourism and the Budget Committee in the Provincial Parliament.

Life and career
Baartman obtained an LLB from the University of Stellenbosch. She became an advocate of the Western Cape High Court in 2017. Soon after her appointment, she worked as a political assistant to the Democratic Alliance's National Assembly Chief Whip, John Steenhuisen.

Baartman took office as a Member of the Western Cape Provincial Parliament in May 2019. She was elected Chairperson of both the Standing Committee on Finance, Economic Opportunities and Tourism and the Budget Committee. She is the youngest elected Member of the Western Cape Provincial Parliament, to date - having been elected at the age of 28.

References

External links
 People's Assembly profile
 Hon Deidré Baartman

Living people
Democratic Alliance (South Africa) politicians
Members of the Western Cape Provincial Parliament
Women members of provincial legislatures of South Africa
1991 births